Boris Stefanov (born 6 May 1946) is a Bulgarian equestrian. He competed in two events at the 1972 Summer Olympics.

References

1946 births
Living people
Bulgarian male equestrians
Olympic equestrians of Bulgaria
Equestrians at the 1972 Summer Olympics
People from Targovishte
20th-century Bulgarian people